Brad Fabel (born November 30, 1955) is an American professional golfer.

Fabel was born in Louisville, Kentucky. He was a semifinalist at the 1973 U.S. Junior Amateur and won 1974 Kentucky State Amateur. He played college golf first at the University of Houston, then at Western Kentucky University. He graduated from WKU in 1982 and turned professional.

Fabel played on the PGA Tour from 1985 to 1993 and 1996 to 2001. His best finish on tour was pair of T-2: at the 1990 Canon Greater Hartford Open and the 1997 Buick Open. He also played on the Nationwide Tour from  1994 to 1995 and 2001 to 2005, winning twice: the 1994 Nike Gateway Classic and  the 1995 Nike Shreveport Open.

Since retiring in 2005, Fabel has worked as a PGA Tour rules official.

Amateur wins
1974 Kentucky State Amateur

Professional wins (2)

Nike Tour wins (2)

*Note: The 1995 Nike Shreveport Open was shortened to 36 holes due to rain.

Playoff record
Other playoff record (0–1)

Results in major championships

CUT = missed the half-way cut
"T" = tied
Note: Fabel never played in the Masters Tournament or The Open Championship

See also
1984 PGA Tour Qualifying School graduates
1986 PGA Tour Qualifying School graduates
1989 PGA Tour Qualifying School graduates
1995 Nike Tour graduates

References

External links

American male golfers
Houston Cougars men's golfers
Western Kentucky Hilltoppers golfers
PGA Tour golfers
Korn Ferry Tour graduates
Golfers from Kentucky
Sportspeople from Louisville, Kentucky
1955 births
Living people